Adam Smarte (born 9 May 1987) is a Liberian former footballer who last played for Ventura County Fusion in the USL Premier Development League.

Career

College and amateur
Smarte grew up in Elk Grove, California, played college soccer at UC Santa Cruz from 2003 to 2007, and played for both Salinas Valley Samba and the San Jose Frogs in the National Premier Soccer League.

Professional
Smarte was drafted with the first overall pick in the 2008 MLS Supplemental Draft by the San Jose Earthquakes.

He was released by the Earthquakes at the end of 2008, having played just 3 games for the team, and subsequently signed for Ventura County Fusion of the USL Premier Development League for the 2009 season, where he appeared as a right-back in the defence instead of his usual forward role. He also went on trial with Major League Soccer side D.C. United in August 2009.

Personal life
He founded the apparel brand Modern Pharaoh in 2013.

Honors

Ventura County Fusion
USL Premier Development League Champions (1): 2009

References

1987 births
Living people
Sportspeople from Monrovia
Liberian footballers
Major League Soccer players
San Jose Earthquakes players
San Jose Frogs players
Ventura County Fusion players
University of California, Santa Cruz alumni
UC Santa Cruz Banana Slugs men's soccer players
USL League Two players
Sportspeople from Elk Grove, California
San Jose Earthquakes draft picks
Association football forwards